Lac de Glandieu is a lake in Ain, France.

Glandieu